AccuPoll is an American company that engages in the design, development, and sale of electronic voting system.  Their associated products and services are for use in federal,

state, local, and private elections in the United States.

Their touch screen voting system provides a machine-readable format for machine scanning of the ballot, and also a format designed for human readability of the ballot content without the mechanical assistance.

AccuPoll's strategic partners 

The company has strategic relationships with partners in systems integration and original equipment manufacturers: 
 EDSUnisys
 Lexmark 
 Source Technologies

References

Election technology companies
Technology companies of the United States
Electronic voting companies